American Sports Medicine Institute (ASMI)  located in Birmingham, Alabama was founded in 1986 by Dr. James Andrews and Dr. Lawrence Lemak with original funding from HealthSouth Corporation. It is a non-profit organization dedicated to improving the understanding, prevention, and treatment of sports-related injuries through research, technology-based education, and information dissemination.

Pitching biomechanics evaluation

The research director at ASMI, Dr. Glenn Fleisig, uses video and computer technology to study the pitching motion of baseball pitchers. High speed video of the pitcher is also collected using a Vision Research high-speed video camera

References

External links
 ASMI website

Organizations based in Birmingham, Alabama
Non-profit organizations based in Alabama
Organizations established in 1986
1986 establishments in Alabama